FC Lokomotyv Smila was a Ukrainian football club from Smila.

History
It was one of the best football clubs from Cherkasy Oblast and it still holds the record for the number of wins in the regional championship and cup competitions. The club became a successor of FC Kharchovyk Smila that participated in the regional championship of Kiev Oblast (Note: Cherkasy Oblast was created in 1954). Lokomotyv holds a record of being the champion 10 times, while its closest pursuer Temp Cherkasy (4 wins) does not exist any longer.

Sometime in the beginning of 2000s the club was dissolved, but in 2005 it was revived at first as a farm club FC Dnipro Cherkasy under the name Dnipro-2 Smila. In 2006 it was reorganized into an independent club as FC Yavir Smila and continues to compete in the regional championships.

League and cup history

{|class="wikitable"
|-bgcolor="#efefef"
! Season
! Div.
! Pos.
! Pl.
! W
! D
! L
! GS
! GA
! P
!Domestic Cup
!colspan=2|Europe
!Notes
|-
|align=center|1995–96
|align=center|4th
|align=center bgcolor=silver|2
|align=center|6
|align=center|3
|align=center|2
|align=center|1
|align=center|5
|align=center|5
|align=center|11
|align=center|1/128
|align=center|
|align=center|
|align=center|Zone 3, Promoted
|-
|align=center|1996–97
|align=center|3rd
|align=center|13
|align=center|32
|align=center|9
|align=center|10
|align=center|13
|align=center|29
|align=center|37
|align=center|37
|align=center|1/64
|align=center|
|align=center|
|align=center|Group B
|-
|align=center|1997–98
|align=center|3rd
|align=center|11
|align=center|32
|align=center|10
|align=center|9
|align=center|13
|align=center|34
|align=center|40
|align=center|39
|align=center|1/128
|align=center|
|align=center|
|align=center|Group B
|-
|align=center|1998–99
|align=center|3rd
|align=center|x
|align=center|7
|align=center|–
|align=center|–
|align=center|–
|align=center|0
|align=center|0
|align=center|–
|align=center|1/64
|align=center|
|align=center|
|align=center|Group B, withdrew
|}

Honours
 Cherkasy Oblast Football Championship
 Winners (11): 1964, 1965, 1966, 1967, 1968, 1969, 1970, 1971, 1973, 1974, 1995

References

Football clubs in Cherkasy Oblast
Lokomotyv Smila
Railway association football clubs in Ukraine
Association football clubs disestablished in the 2000s
2000s disestablishments in Ukraine